The 1994 FA Charity Shield was the 72nd FA Charity Shield, an annual football match played between the winners of the previous season's Premier League and FA Cup competitions. The match was played on 14 August 1994 at Wembley Stadium and contested by Manchester United, who had won the league and cup Double in 1993–94, and Blackburn Rovers, who had finished as runners-up in the Premier League. Manchester United won the match 2–0 with goals from Eric Cantona and Paul Ince, with seven players booked due to a new clampdown imposed by referees.

Notable omissions from the Blackburn side were the previous season's top scorer Alan Shearer (who had a virus from eating seafood) and his new strike partner Chris Sutton, who had just joined them for a national record fee of £5 million. Also absent due to injury were Mike Newell, Kevin Gallacher, Paul Warhurst and David Batty. Stuart Ripley and Ian Pearce made a makeshift front two, with young striker Peter Thorne making his solitary appearance for Blackburn as a substitute. Other debutants for Rovers were experienced defender Tony Gale and Australian winger Robbie Slater.

Meanwhile, Manchester United defender David May made his club debut just weeks after joining them from Blackburn. Denis Irwin and Roy Keane were absent after being given an extended break after playing for the Republic of Ireland in the 1994 FIFA World Cup.

Match details

See also
1993–94 FA Premier League
1993–94 FA Cup

References

FA Community Shield
Charity Shield 1994
Charity Shield 1994
Comm